Fabio Visone (born 26 November 1983) is an Italian football player.

Football career
Visone started his career at Campanian club Avellino of Serie C1. He then played for Palmese in Serie D. In January 2005, he signed for A.S.G. Nocerina. However, in July 2006, he signed a new contract with Sambenedettese, earning 46 appearances and 1 goal. In August, 2009, he signed a contract with Foggia.

External links
 Player Profile at tuttocalciatori

References 

1983 births
Living people
Italian footballers
Association football midfielders
Calcio Foggia 1920 players
Footballers from Naples